The Thai script is the abugida used to write Thai, Southern Thai and many other languages spoken in Thailand. The Thai alphabet itself (as used to write Thai) has 44 consonant symbols (phayanchana), 16 vowel symbols (sara) that combine into at least 32 vowel forms and four tone diacritics (or ) to create characters mostly representing syllables.

Although commonly referred to as the "Thai alphabet", the script is in fact not a true alphabet but an abugida, a writing system in which the full characters represent consonants with diacritical marks for vowels; the absence of a vowel diacritic gives an implied 'a' or 'o'. Consonants are written horizontally from left to right, and vowels following a consonant in speech are written above, below, to the left or to the right of it, or a combination of those.

History

The Thai alphabet is derived from the Old Khmer script (akson khom), which is a southern Brahmic style of writing derived from the south Indian Pallava alphabet. According to tradition it was created in 1283 by King Ramkhamhaeng the Great. The earliest attestation of the Thai script is the Ram Khamhaeng Inscription dated to 1292, however some scholars question its authenticity. The script was derived from a cursive form of the Old Khmer script of the time. It modified and simplified some of the Old Khmer letters and introduced some new ones to accommodate Thai phonology. It also introduced tone marks. Thai is considered to be the first script in the world that invented tone markers to indicate distinctive tones, which are lacking in the Mon-Khmer (Austroasiatic languages) and Indo-Aryan languages from which its script is derived. Although Chinese and other Sino-Tibetan languages have distinctive tones in their phonological system, no tone marker is found in their orthographies. Thus, tone markers are an innovation in the Thai language that later influenced other related Tai languages and some Tibeto-Burman languages on the Southeast Asian mainland. Another addition was consonant clusters that were written horizontally and contiguously, rather than writing the second consonant below the first one. Finally, the script wrote vowel marks on the main line, however this innovation fell out of use not long after.

Orthography
There is a fairly complex relationship between spelling and sound.  There are various issues:
For many consonant sounds, there are two different letters that both represent the same sound, but which cause a different tone to be associated. This stems from a major change (a tone split) that occurred historically in the phonology of the Thai language.  At the time the Thai script was created, the language had three tones and a full set of contrasts between voiced and unvoiced consonants at the beginning of a syllable (e.g. b d g l m n vs. p t k hl hm hn).  At a later time, the voicing distinction disappeared, but in the process, each of the three original tones split in two, with an originally voiced consonant (the modern "low" consonant signs) producing a lower-variant tone, and an originally unvoiced consonant (the modern "mid" and "high" consonant signs) producing a higher-variant tone.
Thai borrowed a large number of words from Sanskrit and Pali, and the Thai alphabet was created so that the original spelling of these words could be preserved as much as possible.  This means that the Thai alphabet has a number of "duplicate" letters that represent separate sounds in Sanskrit and Pali (e.g. the breathy voiced sounds bh, dh, ḍh, jh, gh and the retroflex sounds ṭ ṭh ḍ ḍh ṇ) but which never represented distinct sounds in the Thai language.  These are mostly or exclusively used in Sanskrit and Pali borrowings.
The desire to preserve original Sanskrit and Pali spellings also produces a particularly large number of duplicate ways of spelling sounds at the end of a syllable (where Thai is strictly limited in the sounds that can occur but Sanskrit allowed all possibilities, especially once former final /a/ was deleted), as well as a number of silent letters. Moreover, many consonants from Sanskrit and Pali loanwords are generally silent. The spelling of the words resembles Sanskrit or Pali orthography:
 Thai  (spelled sǎamaarth but pronounced sa-mat  with a silent r and a plain t that is represented using an aspirated consonant) "to be able" (Sanskrit समर्थ samartha)
 Thai  (spelled chanthr but pronounced chan  because the th and the r are silent) "moon" (Sanskrit चन्द्र chandra)
Thai phonology dictates that all syllables must end in a vowel, an approximant, a nasal, or a voiceless plosive. Therefore, the letter written may not have the same pronunciation in the initial position as they do in the final position. See Alphabet listing below for more detail.
Even though the high class letter ho hip ห is used to write the sound /h/, if the letter comes before a low class letter in a syllable, it will become the silent ho nam and turn the initial consonant into high class. See Tones below for more detail.

Thai letters do not have upper- and lower-case forms like Latin letters do. Spaces between words are not used, except in certain linguistically motivated cases.

Punctuation 

A paiyan noi ฯ is used for abbreviation. A paiyan yai ฯลฯ is the same as "etc." in English.

Several obsolete characters indicated the beginning or ending of sections. A bird's eye ๏ (ta kai, officially called , fong man) formerly indicated paragraphs. An angkhan kuu ๚ was formerly used to mark the end of a chapter. A kho mut ๛ was formerly used to mark the end of a document, but is now obsolete.

Alphabet listing
Thai (along with its sister system, Lao) lacks conjunct consonants and independent vowels, while both designs are common among Brahmic scripts (e.g., Burmese and Balinese). In scripts with conjunct consonants, each consonant has two forms: base and conjoined. Consonant clusters are represented with the two styles of consonants. The two styles may form typographical ligatures, as in Devanagari. Independent vowels are used when a syllable starts with a vowel sign.

Consonants

There are 44 consonant letters representing 21 distinct consonant sounds. Duplicate consonants either correspond to sounds that existed in Old Thai at the time the alphabet was created but no longer exist (in particular, voiced obstruents such as b d g v z), or different Sanskrit and Pali consonants pronounced identically in Thai. There are in addition four consonant-vowel combination characters not included in the tally of 44.

Consonants are divided into three classes — in alphabetical order these are middle (klang), high (sung), and low (tam) class — as shown in the table below. These class designations reflect phonetic qualities of the sounds to which the letters originally corresponded in Old Thai. In particular, "middle" sounds were voiceless unaspirated stops; "high" sounds, voiceless aspirated stops or voiceless fricatives; "low" sounds, voiced. Subsequent sound changes have obscured the phonetic nature of these classes. Today, the class of a consonant without a tone mark, along with the short or long length of the accompanying vowel, determine the base accent. Middle class consonants with a long vowel spell an additional four tones with one of four tone marks over the controlling consonant:  mai ek, mai tho, mai tri, and mai chattawa. Differing interpretations of the two marks or their absence allow low class consonants to spell tones not allowed for the corresponding high class consonant. In the case of digraphs where a low class follows a higher class consonant, often the higher class rules apply, but the marker, if used, goes over the low class one; accordingly,  ho nam and  o nam may be considered to be digraphs as such, as explained below the Tone table. 
Notes 

To aid learning, each consonant is traditionally associated with an acrophonic Thai word that either starts with the same sound, or features it prominently. For example, the name of the letter ข is kho khai (ข ไข่), in which kho is the sound it represents, and khai (ไข่) is a word which starts with the same sound and means "egg".

Two of the consonants, ฃ (kho khuat) and ฅ (kho khon), are no longer used in written Thai, but still appear on many keyboards and in character sets. When the first Thai typewriter was developed by Edwin Hunter McFarland in 1892, there was simply no space for all characters, thus two had to be left out. Also, neither of these two letters correspond to a Sanskrit or Pali letter, and each of them, being a modified form of the letter that precedes it (compare ข and ค), has the same pronunciation and the same consonant class as the preceding letter (somewhat like the European long s). This makes them redundant.

Equivalents for romanisation are shown in the table below. Many consonants are pronounced differently at the beginning and at the end of a syllable. The entries in columns initial and final indicate the pronunciation for that consonant in the corresponding positions in a syllable. Where the entry is '-', the consonant may not be used to close a syllable. Where a combination of consonants ends a written syllable, only the first is pronounced; possible closing consonant sounds are limited to 'k', 'm', 'n', 'ng', 'p' and 't'.

Although official standards for romanisation are the Royal Thai General System of Transcription (RTGS) defined by the Royal Thai Institute, and the almost identical  defined by the International Organization for Standardization, many publications use different romanisation systems. In daily practice, a bewildering variety of romanisations are used, making it difficult to know how to pronounce a word, or to judge if two words (e.g. on a map and a street sign) are actually the same. For more precise information, an equivalent from the International Phonetic Alphabet (IPA) is given as well.

Alphabetic

 Notes

Phonetic
The consonants can be organised by place and manner of articulation according to principles of the International Phonetic Association.
Thai distinguishes among three voice/aspiration patterns for plosive consonants:
unvoiced, unaspirated
unvoiced, aspirated
voiced, unaspirated

In each cell below, the first line indicates International Phonetic Alphabet (IPA), the second indicates the Thai characters in initial position (several letters appearing in the same box have identical pronunciation). Note how the conventional alphabetic order shown in the table above follows roughly the table below, reading the coloured blocks from right to left and top to bottom.

Pronunciation of Thai characters in initial position

Although the overall 44 Thai consonants provide 21 sounds in case of initials, the case for finals is different. Note how the consonant sounds in the table for initials collapse in the table for final sounds. At the end of a syllable, all plosives are unvoiced, unaspirated, and have no audible release. Initial affricates and fricatives become final plosives. The initial trill (ร), approximant (ญ), and lateral approximants (ล,ฬ) are realized as a final nasal .

Only 8 ending consonant sounds, as well as no ending consonant sound, are available in Thai pronunciation. Among these consonants, excluding the disused ฃ and ฅ, six (ฉ ผ ฝ ห อ ฮ) cannot be used as a final. The remaining 36 are grouped as following.

Pronunciation of Thai characters in final position

Vowels
Thai vowel sounds and diphthongs are written using a mixture of vowel symbols on a consonant base. Each vowel is shown in its correct position relative to a base consonant and sometimes a final consonant as well. Note that vowels can go above, below, left of or right of the consonant, or combinations of these places. If a vowel has parts before and after the initial consonant, and the syllable starts with a consonant cluster, the split will go around the whole cluster.

Twenty-one vowel symbol elements are traditionally named, which may appear alone or in combination to form compound symbols.

For example,  transcribes  "road". For example,  is written , and  "only" is written .

The characters ฤ ฤๅ (plus ฦ ฦๅ, which are obsolete) are usually considered as vowels, the first being a short vowel sound, and the latter, long. The letters are based on vocalic consonants used in Sanskrit, given the one-to-one letter correspondence of Thai to Sanskrit, although the last two letters are quite rare, as their equivalent Sanskrit sounds only occur in a few, ancient words and thus are functionally obsolete in Thai. The first symbol 'ฤ' is common in many Sanskrit and Pali words and 'ฤๅ' less so, but does occur as the primary spelling for the Thai adaptation of Sanskrit 'rishi' and treu (  or ), a very rare Khmer loan word for 'fish' only found in ancient poetry. As alphabetical entries, ฤ ฤๅ follow ร, and themselves can be read as a combination of consonant and vowel, equivalent to รึ (short), and รือ (long) (and the obsolete pair as ลึ, ลือ), respectively. Moreover, ฤ  can act as ริ  as an integral part in many words mostly borrowed from Sanskrit such as กฤษณะ  (kritsana, not kruetsana), ฤทธิ์ (rit, not ruet), and กฤษดา (kritsada, not kruetsada), for example. It is also used to spell อังกฤษ angkrit England/English. The word ฤกษ์ (roek) is a unique case where ฤ is pronounced like เรอ. In the past, prior to the turn of the twentieth century, it was common for writers to substitute these letters in native vocabulary that contained similar sounds as a shorthand that was acceptable in writing at the time. For example, the conjunction 'or' (  reu, cf.   lu) was often written . This practice has become obsolete, but can still be seen in Thai literature. 

The pronunciation below is indicated by the International Phonetic Alphabet  and the Romanisation according to the Royal Thai Institute as well as several variant Romanisations often encountered. A very approximate equivalent is given for various regions of English speakers and surrounding areas. Dotted circles represent the positions of consonants or consonant clusters. The first one represents the initial consonant and the latter (if it exists) represents the final.

Ro han (ร หัน) is not usually considered a vowel and is not included in the following table. It represents the sara a  vowel in certain Sanskrit loanwords and appears as ◌รร◌. When used without a final consonant (◌รร),  is implied as the final consonant, giving .

Tone

Central Thai
Thai is a tonal language, and the script gives full information on the tones. Tones are realised in the vowels, but indicated in the script by a combination of the class of the initial consonant (high, mid or low), vowel length (long or short), closing consonant (plosive or sonorant, i.e., dead or live) and, if present, one of four tone marks, whose names derive from the names of the digits 1–4 borrowed from Pali or Sanskrit. The rules for denoting tones are shown in the following chart:

"None", that is, no tone marker, is used with the base accent (พื้นเสียง). Mai tri and mai chattawa are only used with mid-class consonants.

Two consonant characters (not diacritics) are used to modify the tone:
ห นำ ho nam, leading ho. A silent, high-class ห "leads" low-class nasal stops (ง, ญ, น and ม) and non-plosives (ว, ย, ร and ล), which have no corresponding high-class phonetic match, into the tone properties of a high-class consonant. In polysyllabic words, an initial mid- or high-class consonant with an implicit vowel similarly "leads" these same low-class consonants into the higher class tone rules, with the tone marker borne by the low-class consonant.
อ นำ o nam, leading o. In four words only, a silent, mid-class อ "leads" low-class ย into mid-class tone rules: อย่า (ya, don't) อยาก (yak, desire) อย่าง (yang, kind, sort, type) อยู่ (yu, stay). Note all four have long-vowel, low-tone siang ek; อยาก, a dead syllable, needs no tone marker, but the three live syllables all take mai ek.

In some dialects where words are spelled with one tone but pronounced with another often occur in informal conversation (notably the pronouns ฉัน chan and เขา khao, which are both pronounced with a high tone rather than the rising tone indicated by the script). Generally, when such words are recited or read in public, they are pronounced as spelled.

Southern Thai

Spoken Southern Thai can have up to seven tones. When Southern Thai is written in Thai script, there are different rules for indicating spoken tone.

Diacritics
Other diacritics are used to indicate short vowels and silent letters:
 means "stick that climbs and squats". It is a miniature Thai numeral 8 ๘.  is often used with sara e (เ) and sara ae (แ) in closed syllables.
Thanthakhat means "capital punishment".

Fan nu means "rat teeth" and is thought as being placed in combination with short sara i and fong man to form other characters.

Numerals

For numerals, mostly the standard Hindu-Arabic numerals (lek hindu arabik) are used, but Thai also has its own set of Thai numerals that are based on the Hindu-Arabic numeral system (lek thai), which are mostly limited to government documents, election posters, license plates of military vehicles, and special entry prices for Thai nationals.

Other symbols

Pai-yan noi and angkhan diao share the same character. Sara a (–ะ) used in combination with other characters is called wisanchani.

Some of the characters can mark the beginning or end of a sentence, chapter, or episode of a story or of a stanza in a poem. These have changed use over time and are becoming uncommon.

Summary charts

colour codes

red: dead

green: alive

 If the syllable contains no ending consonants, it is considered alive if the vowel is long and dead if it is short.

colour codes

pink: long vowel, shortened by add "ะ"(no ending consonant) or "-็"(with ending consonant)

green: long vowel, has a special form when shortened

Sanskrit and Pali

The Thai script (like all Indic scripts) uses a number of modifications to write Sanskrit and related languages (in particular, Pali). Pali is very closely related to Sanskrit and is the liturgical language of Thai Buddhism. In Thailand, Pali is written and studied using a slightly modified Thai script. The main difference is that each consonant is followed by an implied short a (อะ), not the 'o', or 'ə' of Thai: this short a is never omitted in pronunciation, and if the vowel is not to be pronounced, then a specific symbol must be used, the  อฺ (a solid dot under the consonant). This means that sara a (อะ) is never used when writing Pali, because it is always implied. For example, namo is written นะโม in Thai, but in Pali it is written as นโม, because the อะ is redundant. The Sanskrit word 'mantra' is written มนตร์ in Thai (and therefore pronounced mon), but is written มนฺตฺร in Sanskrit (and therefore pronounced mantra). When writing Pali, only 33 consonants and 12 vowels are used.

This is an example of a Pali text written using the Thai Sanskrit orthography: อรหํ สมฺมาสมฺพุทฺโธ ภควา . Written in modern Thai orthography, this becomes อะระหัง สัมมาสัมพุทโธ ภะคะวา arahang sammasamphuttho phakhawa.

In Thailand, Sanskrit is read out using the Thai values for all the consonants (so ค is read as kha and not [ga]), which makes Thai spoken Sanskrit incomprehensible to sanskritists not trained in Thailand. The Sanskrit values are used in transliteration (without the diacritics), but these values are never actually used when Sanskrit is read out loud in Thailand. The vowels used in Thai are identical to Sanskrit, with the exception of ฤ, ฤๅ, ฦ, and ฦๅ, which are read using their Thai values, not their Sanskrit values. Sanskrit and Pali are not tonal languages, but in Thailand, the Thai tones are used when reading these languages out loud.

In the tables in this section, the Thai value (transliterated according to the Royal Thai system) of each letter is listed first, followed by the IAST value of each letter in square brackets. Remember that in Thailand, the IAST values are never used in pronunciation, but only sometimes in transcriptions (with the diacritics omitted). This disjoint between transcription and spoken value explains the romanisation for Sanskrit names in Thailand that many foreigners find confusing. For example, สุวรรณภูมิ is romanised as Suvarnabhumi, but pronounced su-wan-na-phum. ศรีนครินทร์ is romanised as Srinagarindra but pronounced si-nakha-rin.

Plosives

Plosives (also called stops) are listed in their traditional Sanskrit order, which corresponds to Thai alphabetical order from ก to ม with three exceptions: in Thai, high-class ข is followed by two obsolete characters with no Sanskrit equivalent, high-class ฃ and low-class ฅ; low-class ช is followed by sibilant ซ (low-class equivalent of high-class sibilant ส that follows ศ and ษ.)   The table gives the Thai value first, and then the IAST (International Alphabet of Sanskrit Transliteration) value in square brackets.

None of the Sanskrit plosives are pronounced as the Thai voiced plosives, so these are not represented in the table. While letters are listed here according to their class in Sanskrit, Thai has lost the distinction between many of the consonants. So, while there is a clear distinction between ช and ฌ in Sanskrit, in Thai these two consonants are pronounced identically (including tone). Likewise, the Thai phonemes do not differentiate between the retroflex and dental classes, because Thai has no retroflex consonants. The equivalents of all the retroflex consonants are pronounced identically to their dental counterparts: thus ฏ is pronounced like ต, ฐ is pronounced like ถ, ฑ is pronounced like ท, ฒ is pronounced like ธ, and ณ is pronounced like น.

The Sanskrit unaspirated unvoiced plosives are pronounced as unaspirated unvoiced, whereas Sanskrit aspirated voiced plosives are pronounced as aspirated unvoiced.

Non-plosives

Semivowels (กึ่งสระ kueng sara) and liquids come in Thai alphabetical order after ม, the last of the plosives. The term อวรรค awak means "without a break"; that is, without a plosive.

Sibilants 
Inserted sounds (เสียดแทรก siat saek) follow the semi-vowel ว in alphabetical order.

Like Sanskrit, Thai has no voiced sibilant (so no 'z' or 'zh'). In modern Thai, the distinction between the three high-class consonants has been lost and all three are pronounced 'sà'; however, foreign words with a sh-sound may still be transcribed as if the Sanskrit values still hold (e.g., ang-grit อังกฤษ for English instead of อังกฤส).
ศ ศาลา (so sala) leads words, as in its example word, ศาลา. The digraph ศรี (Indic sri) is regularly pronounced สี (si), as in Sisaket Province, Thai: ศรีสะเกษ.
ษ ฤๅษี (so rue-si) may only lead syllables within a word, as in its example, ฤๅษี, or to end a syllable as in ศรีสะเกษ Sisaket and อังกฤษ Angkrit English.
ส เสือ (so suea) spells native Thai words that require a high-class /s/, as well as naturalized Pali/Sanskrit words, such as สารท (สาท) in Thetsakan Sat: เทศกาลสารท (เทด-สะ-กาน-สาท), formerly ศารท (สาท).
ซ โซ่ (so so), which follows the similar-appearing ช in Thai alphabetical order, spells words requiring a low-class /s/, as does ทร + vowel.
ทร, as in the heading of this section, เสียดแทรก  (pronounced เสียดแซก siat saek), when accompanied by a vowel (implicit in ทรง (ซง song an element in forming words used with royalty); a semivowel in ทรวง (ซวง suang chest, heart); or explicit in ทราย (ซาย sai sand). Exceptions to ทร + vowel = /s/ are the prefix โทร- (equivalent to tele- far, pronounced โทระ to-ra), and phonetic re-spellings of English tr- (as in the phonetic respelling of trumpet: ทรัมเพ็ท.) ทร is otherwise pronounced as two syllables ทอระ-, as in ทรมาน (ทอระมาน to-ra-man to torment).

Voiced h

ห, a high-class consonant, comes next in alphabetical order, but its low-class equivalent, ฮ, follows similar-appearing อ as the last letter of the Thai alphabet. Like modern Hindi, the voicing has disappeared, and the letter is now pronounced like English 'h'. Like Sanskrit, this letter may only be used to start a syllable, but may not end it. (A popular beer is romanized as Singha, but in Thai is สิงห์, with a karan on the ห; correct pronunciation is "sing", but foreigners to Thailand typically say "sing-ha".)

Voiced lla

This represents the retroflex liquid of Pali and Vedic Sanskrit, which does not exist in Classical Sanskrit.

Vowels

All consonants have an inherent 'a' sound, and therefore there is no need to use the ะ symbol when writing Sanskrit. The Thai vowels อื, ไอ, ใอ, and so forth, are not used in Sanskrit. The zero consonant, อ, is unique to the Indic alphabets descended from Khmer. When it occurs in Sanskrit, it is always the zero consonant and never the vowel o . Its use in Sanskrit is therefore to write vowels that cannot be otherwise written alone: e.g., อา or อี.

The vowel sign อำ occurs in Sanskrit, but only as the combination of the pure vowels sara a อา with nikkhahit อํ.

Other non-Thai symbols
There are a number of additional symbols only used to write Sanskrit or Pali, and not used in writing Thai.

Nikkhahit (anusvāra)

In Sanskrit, the anusvāra indicates a certain kind of nasal sound. In Thai this is written as an open circle above the consonant, known as nikkhahit, from Pali niggahīta. Nasalisation does not occur in Thai, therefore, a nasal stop is always substituted: e.g. ตํ , is pronounced as ตัง tang by Thai Sanskritists. If nikkhahit occurs before a consonant, then Thai uses a nasal stop of the same class: e.g. สํสฺกฺฤตา  is read as สันสกฤตา san-sa-krit-ta (The ส following the nikkhahit is a dental-class consonant, therefore the dental-class nasal stop น is used). For this reason, it has been suggested that in Thai, nikkhahit should be listed as a consonant. Also, traditional Pali grammars describe nikkhahit as a consonant.  Nikkhahit นิคหิต occurs as part of the Thai vowels sara am อำ and sara ue อึ.

Phinthu (virāma)
อฺ

Because the Thai script is an abugida, a symbol (equivalent to virāma in devanagari) needs to be added to indicate that the implied vowel is not to be pronounced.

Yamakkan 
อ๎

Yamakkan is an obsolete symbol used to mark the beginning of consonant clusters: e.g. พ๎ราห๎มณ phramana . Without the yamakkan, this word would be pronounced   instead. This is a feature unique to the Thai script (other Indic scripts use a combination of ligatures, conjuncts or virāma to convey the same information). The symbol is obsolete because  may be used to achieve the same effect: พฺราหฺมณ.

Visarga

The means of recording visarga (final voiceless 'h') in Thai has reportedly been lost, although the character ◌ะ which is used to transcribe a short /a/ or to add a glottal stop after a vowel is the closest equivalent and can be seen used as a visarga in some Thai-script Sanskrit text.

Unicode

Thai script was added to the Unicode Standard in October 1991 with the release of version 1.0.

The Unicode block for Thai is U+0E00–U+0E7F.
It is a verbatim copy of the older TIS-620 character set which encodes the vowels เ, แ, โ, ใ and ไ before the consonants they follow, and thus Thai, Lao, Tai Viet and New Tai Lue are the only Brahmic scripts in Unicode that use visual order instead of logical order.

Keyboard layouts

Thai characters can be typed using the Kedmanee layout and the Pattachote layout.

See also
 Thai language
 Thai typography
 Thai numerals
 Thai braille
 Thai literature
 Thai honorifics
 Thai spelling reform of 1942 – simplified spelling system in use from 1942 to 1944

References

External links

 Comprehensive free Thai alphabet resource
 Comparing Thai script with Devanagari, Khmer, Burmese, and Tai Tham
 Omniglot - Thai
 Thai consonants
 Thai vowels
 Transliterations for Thai Vowels, Thai Consonants
 Phonetic Organization of the Thai Consonants, by Richard Wordingham
 Virtual Thai Keyboard Freeware for the Windows operating system
 Insert Zero-Width Space Character – This utility prepares Thai text by inserting the Unicode "Zero-Width Space Character" between detected word breaks.

Brahmic scripts
Thai language
Writing systems without word boundaries